The Chief of the General Staff (CGst, or Generalstabschef) was from 1873 to 1937 the second most senior member of the Swedish Army (after the King of Sweden) and headed the General Staff. The position was held by a senior member of the Swedish Army. In 1937, the position was abolished and the position of Chief of the Defence Staff was established.

Chiefs of the General Staff

See also
Chief of the Defence Staff

Footnotes

References

Notes

Military appointments of Sweden
Sweden